Inverness High School is a secondary school on Montague Row in Inverness, Scotland.

Admissions
From a peak of over 1,600 pupils, the school's current roll is around 450. Its feeders are Central, Dalneigh, Bishop Eden's, St Joseph's and Merkinch Primary Schools. It is situated west of the river and west of Kenneth Street (A82).

In 2005, it became one of the first twenty eight schools in Scotland to be awarded Schools of Ambition status.

The current Rector at Inverness High School is John Rutter, who succeeded Ritchie Cunningham who retired after 23 and a half years as Rector in April 2014. Cunningham held the title of longest serving Rector in the Highlands. Mr Rutter's two deputes are Ms. Fife and Mrs. Huggan.

History
After occupying various sites around the city, it moved to its current location, in Dalneigh, in 1937. At that time, it was renamed the Technical High School and specialised in providing vocational courses. It kept this name until 1959 when it adopted its current name. In 2008 there was a temporary closure when a fire started in the Assembly Hall. Luckily, it was a night time and during the Annual October break.

Notable former pupils

 Mike Edwards Inverness journalist, author and soldier
 David Mackenzie, General Secretary of the Transport Salaried Staffs' Association
 Ali Smith, author and Booker Prize nominee
 David Stewart, Labour MP for Inverness East, Nairn and Lochaber 1997-2005
Gary Cornish, Scottish Heavyweight Boxer.

See also

 Inverness Royal Academy
 school

References

External links
 Website
 Inverness High School's page on Scottish Schools Online

Educational institutions established in 1878
Secondary schools in Inverness
Category B listed buildings in Highland (council area)
1878 establishments in Scotland